Mismatched Couples (a.k.a. Love Meets the Match) is a 1985 Hong Kong action romantic comedy film directed by Yuen Woo-ping and starring himself alongside Donnie Yen.

The film was created during hip hop culture's height of popularity in the 1980s, and in addition to martial arts, incorporates b-boying, popping, locking, and the electric boogaloo.

Plot
Eddie (Donnie Yen) is a martial artist and hip hop dancer. In the film, he befriends a poor old man named Mini (Yuen Woo-ping). Mini later falls in love with Eddie's older sister, Ying (Wong Wan-si). Later, Eddie's cousin, Stella (May Lo), falls for him, but Eddie actually has his eyes on Anna (Anna Kamiyama). Meanwhile, Kenny (Kenny Perez) also has his eyes on Anna, while there is a fighting champion (Dick Wei) who is obsessed with fighting Eddie.

Cast

External links
 
 Mismatched Couples at Hong Kong Cinemagic
 

1985 films
Hong Kong action comedy films
Hong Kong romantic comedy films
Hong Kong martial arts comedy films
1980s Cantonese-language films
1980s action comedy films
1985 romantic comedy films
1980s martial arts comedy films
1980s hip hop films
Films directed by Yuen Woo-ping
Films set in Hong Kong
Films shot in Hong Kong
Breakdancing films
1980s Hong Kong films